

Buildings and structures

Buildings

 Construction begins on the Basilica of the Vierzehnheiligen, in Bavaria, designed by Johann Balthasar Neumann.
 Dresden Frauenkirche, in Dresden, Germany, designed by George Bähr, is completed.
 Eltzer Hof in Mainz completed
 September 29 – Church of the Gesuati on the Giudecca canal in Venice, designed by Giorgio Massari in 1724, is consecrated.

Births
 April 13 – Thomas Jefferson, American President and amateur architect (died 1826)

Deaths
 May 22 – Thomas Archer, English Baroque architect (born 1668)

References

Architecture
Years in architecture
18th-century architecture